Romania is a country located in Central and Eastern Europe.

Romania or Rumania may also refer to:

Romania (European Parliament constituency)
Empire of Romania or Latin Empire, a Crusader state set up after the Fourth Crusade conquered the city-state of Constantinople
Kingdom of Romania, a constitutional monarchy in southeastern Europe from 1881 to 1947
Greater Romania, the borders of the Kingdom of Romania in the interwar period
Socialist Republic of Romania, a socialist Soviet satellite state that existed during the Cold War period
Byzantine Empire or Romania, the continuation of the Roman Empire in the East during Late Antiquity and the Middle Ages
Romania (train), a Bucharest-Sofia passenger train
ST Rumania, a British tugboat previously named Empire Susan
Roumania, Roumania, a popular, nostalgic song in Yiddish by Aaron Lebedeff

See also
:Category:National sports teams of Romania, teams called "Romania"
Romance languages
Romanija, a geographical region in eastern Bosnia and Herzegovina
Romanija (disambiguation)